or  is a lake that lies in the municipality of Saltdal in Nordland county, Norway. The lake is regulated for hydroelectric power at the Daja Hydroelectric Power Station  to the north in Sulitjelma.

See also
 List of lakes in Norway
 Geography of Norway

References

Saltdal
Lakes of Nordland